Gorm's is a chain of pizza restaurants headquartered in Copenhagen, Denmark.

History
Gorm's traces its history back to 2003 when Gorm Wisweh began to bake pizzas in his mother's café in Svaneke on the island of Bornholm. He later opened a pizzeria at Magstræde 16 in Copenhagen together with a group of friends. It was later followed by several other pizza restaurants in the city. The first Gorm's outside Copenhagen opened in Brandts Klædefabrik in Odense in May 2017.

A 67 % share of the company was acquired by Orkla in 2018. The opening of eight new restaurants have later been announced.

Restaurants
Aarhus (1)
 Jægergårdsgade 6

Copenhagen (8)
 Amagerbrogade 83
 Copenhagen Airport (Terminal 2)
 Kalvebod Brygge 59 (Fisketorvet)
 Israels Plads (Torvehallerne)
 Magstræde 16
 Nyhavn 14
 Tivoli Gardens
 Ørestads Boulevard 102b (Field's)

Kolding (1)
 Akseltorv 8A

 Odense (1)
 Amfipladsen 3

References

External links
 Gorm's

Restaurant chains in Denmark
Pizza chains
Restaurants in Copenhagen
Restaurants in Aarhus
Companies based in Herlev Municipality
Danish companies established in 2008
Restaurants established in 2008